Hamstringing is a method of crippling a person or animal so that they cannot walk properly by severing the hamstring tendons in the thigh of the individual. It is used as a method of torture, or to incapacitate the victim.

Use
Hamstringing is used primarily to incapacitate a human or animal and render them incapable of effective movement. The severing of the hamstring muscles results not only in the crippling of the leg, but also in pain.

Method
In humans, the hamstring extends between the hip and knee joints. The hamstring muscle group is made up of the biceps femoris, semitendinosus muscle, and the semimembranosus. It facilitates both the flexing of the knee and hip extension, making it a vital contributor to normal leg-movement.  By severing these muscles or the tendons involved in this process, normal leg-movement is disrupted. In addition to sustaining massive bleeding, the injured leg becomes useless and the victim is rendered  lame. The severing of the hamstring is usually accomplished through use of a blade such as a knife or sword.

Medical treatment
Due to a lack of research in the field of critical hamstring injuries, current injury-management practice is quite limited. Management of the injury is based solely "on clinical experience, anecdotal evidence and the knowledge of the biological basis of tissue repair".  These injuries are difficult to control or repair, leading often to permanent injury or even death by exsanguination.

Historical usage

Sources from late antiquity indicate that hamstringing was commonly used to incapacitate combatants, prisoners and runaway slaves.

Use as metaphor
Literally, to "hamstring" an individual is to sever the tissues of their hamstring. As a metaphor, to be "hamstrung" suggests being limited, by external imposition or not, in a way that prevents full freedom of movement or utilization of resources.

Biblical reference

Rendering chariot-horses lame by hamstringing is mentioned in the Book of Joshua in the Bible  (the King James Version uses the term "", from an old spelling of  hock). In times of war, hamstringing an enemy's horses prevented the horses from being used in fighting.

References 

Torture
Hamstring